Campestre da Serra (literally a field surrounded by forest and mountains) is a municipality in the southern state Rio Grande do Sul, Brazil. It's 2526 feet above sea level.  As of 2020, the estimated population was 3,395.

Climate

See also
List of municipalities in Rio Grande do Sul

References

Municipalities in Rio Grande do Sul